This is a list of the works of the German composer Paul Hindemith (1895–1963).

Operas

Oratorio
Das Unaufhörliche (1931)
When Lilacs Last in the Dooryard Bloom'd: (A Requiem for those we love), for mezzo-soprano and baritone soloists, chorus, and orchestra, based on the poem by Walt Whitman (1946)

Ballets
Der Dämon, Op. 28 (1922)
Triadisches Ballett, with Oskar Schlemmer (1923)
Nobilissima Visione, with Léonide Massine (1938)
The Four Temperaments (scored for piano and strings) (1940)
Hérodiade (1944)

Orchestral

Concertante

Vocal

Lustige Lieder in Aargauer Mundart (Merry Songs in the Aargau Dialect), Op. 5, for high voice and piano (1914–16)
Drei Gesänge, Op. 9, for soprano and large orchestra (1917)
Melancholie, Op. 13, 4 lieder for mezzo-soprano and string quartet, based on poems by Christian Morgenstern (1919)
Hymns by Walt Whitman (3), for baritone and piano, Op. 14 (1919)
Acht Gesänge, Op. 18, for soprano voice and piano (1920)
Des Todes Tod, Op. 23a, three songs, based on poems by Eduard Reinacher, for voice, 2 violas and 2 violoncellos (1922)
Die junge Magd, Op. 23b, six poems by Georg Trakl, for voice, flute, clarinet and string quartet (1922)
Tuttifäntchen,  (Christmas Fairytale with singing and dancing in three scenes)
Das Marienleben, Op. 27, song cycle for soprano and piano, based on poems by Rainer Maria Rilke, which exists in two versions. (There is also an orchestration by the composer of six of the songs from the cycle, for soprano and orchestra) (1923/48)
Sing und Spielmusiken für Liebhaber und Musikfreunde, Op. 45 (1928/29)
"Frau Musika", lyrics by Martin Luther
8 canons for voices with instruments
"Ein Jäger aus Kurpfalz", for strings and woodwinds
"Kleine Klaviermusik", easy pentatonic pieces
"Martinslied", soloist or unison choir
"Hin und zurück", Op. 45a, sketch with music, lyrics: Marcellus Schiffer, (1927)
Six Chansons, 6 pieces for a cappella choir, settings of French poetry by Rainer Maria Rilke (1939)
"La biche"
"Un cygne"
"Puisque tout passe"
"Printemps"
"En hiver"
"Verger"
Sancta Susanna, Op. 21, cantata for soli, choir and orchestra, lyrics: August Stramm
Apparebit repentina dies, cantata in four movements for mixed choir (SATB) and brass ensemble (4 horns (F), 2 trumpets (B♭), 3 trombones, tuba), (1947)
Ite, angeli veloces, cantata (1955)
12 Fünfstimmige Madrigale for mixed chorus (1958)
Mass for mixed chorus (1963)
 ″Die Serenaden″, Op.35 (1924) for soprano voice, oboe, viola, and cello

Chamber music

Solo (and solo with piano)

Solo piano
Source.

Solo organ
Two Pieces for Organ (1918)
Organ Sonata No. 1 (1937)
Organ Sonata No. 2 (1937)
Organ Sonata No. 3 (on ancient folk songs) (1940)

Other
Soundtrack for Hans Richter's 1928 avant-garde film Ghosts Before Breakfast (Vormittagsspuk), subsequently lost.

Notes

References

Skelton, Geoffrey (1992), "Hindemith, Paul" in The New Grove Dictionary of Opera, ed. Stanley Sadie (London)

External links
Catalogue of works, Hindemith Foundation

 
Hindemith